Blackstone Legacy is the debut album by trumpeter Woody Shaw recorded in 1970 and released on the Contemporary label.

Moved by the highly charged political sensibilities among creative artists during the latter part of the 1960s and early 1970s, Shaw's message for Blackstone Legacy spoke to the social and political ills of his time. In the liner notes to Blackstone Legacy, Shaw states:

“This album is dedicated to the youth who will benefit mankind. To the youth who are constantly aware of the turmoil in which the world is and who are trying to right all these wrongs – whether in music or in speech or in any other way of positive work.
 
This album is dedicated to the freedom of Black people all over the world.  And it’s dedicated to the people in the ghettos here.  The ‘stone’ in the title is the image of strength.  I grew up in a ghetto – funky houses, rats and roaches, stinking hallways.  I’ve seen all of that, and I’ve seen people overcome all of that.  This music is meant to be a light of hope, a sound of strength and of coming through.  It’s one for the ghetto.
 
We’re trying to express what’s happening in the world today as we – a new breed of young musicians –  feel it.  I mean the different tensions in the world, the ridiculous war in Vietnam, the oppression of poor people in this, a country of such wealth.  The cats on this date usually discuss these things, but we’re all also trying to reach a state of spiritual enlightenment in which we’re continually aware of what’s happening but react in a positive way.  The music in this album, you see, expresses strength – confidence that we’ll overcome these things.”

Reception

Michael G. Nastos of Allmusic called the album, "Truly a landmark recording, and a pivot point in the history of post-modern music".

Track listing 
All compositions by Woody Shaw except as indicated
 "Blackstone Legacy" - 16:08 
 "Think On Me" (George Cables) - 10:45 
 "Lost and Found" - 11:57
 "New World" (Cables) - 18:30
 "Boo-Ann's Grand" - 14:25
 "A Deed for Dolphy" - 8:56

Personnel 
Woody Shaw - trumpet 
Gary Bartz - alto saxophone, soprano saxophone
Bennie Maupin - tenor saxophone, bass clarinet
George Cables - piano, electric piano
Ron Carter - bass
Clint Houston - electric bass
Lenny White - drums

References 

Woody Shaw albums
1971 debut albums
Contemporary Records albums